The 2002 All-Ireland Senior Football Championship was the 116th staging of the All-Ireland Senior Football Championship, the Gaelic Athletic Association's premier inter-county Gaelic football tournament. The championship began on 5 May 2002 and ended on 22 September 2002.

Galway entered the championship as the defending champions, however, they were defeated by Kerry in the All-Ireland quarter-final.

On 22 September 2002, Armagh won the championship following a 1-12 to 0-14 defeat of Kerry in the All-Ireland final. This was their first All-Ireland title. It remains their only All-Ireland title.

Armagh's Oisín McConville was the championship's top scorer with 1-40. His teammate Kieran McGeeney was the choice for the three Footballer of the Year awards.

Format
The Qualifier Rounds system, first used in 2001 was again used in this year.

Results

Connacht Senior Football Championship

Quarter-finals

Semi-finals

Final

Munster Senior Football Championship

Quarter-finals

Semi-finals

Finals

Ulster Senior Football Championship

Preliminary round

Quarter-finals

Semi-finals

Final

Leinster Senior Football Championship

First round

Quarter-finals

Semi-finals

Final

All-Ireland Qualifiers

Round 1

Round 2

Round 3

Round 4

All-Ireland Senior Football Championship

Quarter-finals

 

 

Semi-finals

Final

Championship statistics

Top scorers

Overall

Single game

Miscellaneous
 This year New York in their fourth season in the Connacht championship are give home ground.
 Sligo play Leitrim in the Connacht championship for the first time since 1991.
 There was a triple of draws & replays in the Munster football championship in the 2 semi-finals between Clare vs Tipperary and Cork vs Kerry also final between Cork vs Tipperary.
 Galway and Sligo meet in the Connacht final for the first time since 1971.
 During the course of the championship there were a number of first-time championship meetings. 
Waterford V Roscommon
Wicklow V London
Wexford V Tyrone
Monaghan V Louth
Longford V Down
Antrim V Westmeath
Cavan V Limerick
Westmeath V Fermanagh
Longford V Derry
Tyrone V Leitrim
Kerry V Wicklow
Limerick V Offaly
Kerry V Fermanagh
Mayo V Limerick
Sligo V Tyrone
Armagh V Sligo
 The All-Ireland qualifiers saw Tipperary face Mayo in the championship for the first time since 1920.
 Armagh qualified for the All-Ireland final for the first time since 1977. They became the 18th team to win the All-Ireland title.

References